Pic Ramougn (3,011 m) is a steep, rocky mountain in the Néouvielle massif in the Pyrenees.

It is located in the commune of Saint-Lary-Soulan within the department of the Hautes-Pyrénées, and is named after the French politician, geologist and botanist Louis Ramond de Carbonnières. Ramougn is the pronunciation of Ramond in the Gascon language.

External links
 Map of Ramougn, with an account of an ascent (in Spanish)

Mountains of Hautes-Pyrénées
Mountains of the Pyrenees
Pyrenean three-thousanders